Sabse Bada Rupaiya may refer to:

 Sabse Bada Rupaiya (TV series)
 Sabse Bada Rupaiya (1955 film)
 Sabse Bada Rupaiya (1976 film)